Nosema locustae is a microsporidium fungus that is used to kill grasshoppers, caterpillars, some corn borers and crickets.

Effects on grasshoppers 
When consumed, N. locustae affects the digestive system of a grasshopper through a buildup in the gut, eventually killing it by creating lethargy and a lack of appetite; it is also transferable from a deceased infected grasshopper that is consumed. In a study done at Linköping University using N. locustae and a central Ethiopian grasshopper species, 55% of the grasshoppers that were not inoculated reached adulthood, while only 19% of the ones that were inoculated did.

Farm Application 
The spores are typically applied to a carrier, usually wheat bran, and can be spread through the use of a variety of devices.  Typical application is one pound per acre, at a rate of 1 billion plus spores.

References 

Fungal pest control agents
Biological control agents of pest insects
Microsporidia
Fungi described in 1953